STart was a computer magazine covering the Atari ST published from Summer 1986 through April/May 1991—42 issues total.  STart began as sections of Atari 8-bit family magazine Antic, before being spun off into a separate publication. Its primarily competitor ST-Log was similarly spawned by ANALOG Computing. Each issue of STart included a cover disk.

See also
Atari ST User, A British Atari ST magazine
Page 6, Long-running Atari magazine for 8-bit and ST machines

References

External links
STart Magazine archive—At the Classic Computer Magazine Archive
Archived STart magazines on the Internet Archive

Atari ST magazines
Defunct computer magazines published in the United States
Magazines established in 1986
Magazines disestablished in 1991